Elisabeth Marschall (May 27, 1886 – May 3, 1947) was the Head Nurse (Oberschwester) at the Ravensbrück concentration camp. Her duties included selecting prisoners for execution, overseeing medical experiments, and selecting which prisoners would be shipped to Auschwitz. She worked with Dr. Adolf Winkelmann and Dr. Percival Treite.

At the Hamburg Ravensbrück trials, Marschall was found guilty and sentenced to death. On May 3, 1947, she was hanged by British executioner Albert Pierrepoint on the gallows in Hamelin Prison. Nearly 61 when she died, Marschall was the oldest female Nazi war criminal to be executed by the British occupation authorities.

References

Sources

1886 births
1947 deaths
Holocaust perpetrators in Germany
People from Meiningen
People from Saxe-Meiningen
Nazi Party members
Female guards in Nazi concentration camps
Nazi human subject research
Executed people from Thuringia
Hamburg Ravensbrück trials executions
Executed German women
German women nurses
German nurses
Ravensbrück concentration camp personnel

Executed mass murderers